Paul Kruszewski (born 1967) is a Canadian AI technologist and serial entrepreneur known for his work in artificial intelligence and computer graphics. He has founded three AI startups, including , specializing in crowd simulation, NPC behaviours, and human pose estimation. His projects have gradually gotten more complex as he's moved from developing AI software capable of understanding many people doing simple tasks to fewer people engaged in more complex tasks to perfect knowledge of individual body language.

Academic life 
Kruszewski completed his bachelor's degree in computer science at the University of Alberta. While attending U of A, he was president of the Computer Science Association. After graduating, he went on to obtain an MA and PhD in computer science from McGill University. For graduate school, Kruszewski received a Natural Sciences and Engineering Research Council of Canada (NSERC) Science and Engineering scholarship in 1992. His PhD thesis on random binary trees suggested a method to produce realistic images of trees digitally. His work was inspired by The Algorithmic Beauty of Plants by Przemysław Prusinkiewicz. After completing his thesis, Kruszewski developed and commercialized the software, naming it the "Tree Druid."

Professional life

Work in industry 
After obtaining his PhD, Kruszewski held various positions across North America, Europe, and Asia. During this time he developed the first cloud-based human simulator at My Virtual Model. He also developed both the PS2 and Xbox game engines at Behaviour Interactive.

Entrepreneurial initiatives

BioGraphic Technologies Inc. 
Kruszewski founded BioGraphic Technologies (BGT) in 2000. BGT is best known for developing "AI.implant", a crowd simulation program. Working from his previous experience in video game development, Kruszewski focused BGT's vision on the film and gaming industries, collaborating with such companies as Lucas Films, Disney and Sony Computer Entertainment. Engenuity Technologies, now Presagis, a modeling and simulation software provider, saw the benefits of simulating large civilian crowds for training purposes, purchasing the company in 2005. Kruszewski became the CTO of Engenuity.

GripHeavyIndustries 
In July 2007, Kruszewski founded GripHeavyIndustries, better known as Grip Entertainment, which created complex AI characters for a range of game developers, such as EA, Disney, and BioWare. The company is credited on such titles as Army of Two: The 40th Day and Deus Ex: Human Revolution.

In 2011, the company experienced some controversy when gamers rallied against Grip's boss fights at the end of the game Deus Ex: Human Revolution. Eidos Montreal had outsourced the development of the game's boss fights to Grip due to time constraints and the complex nature of the open-ended gameplay. Players felt that the fights were inflexible when compared with the rest of the game, causing a stir in the industry. That same year, Autodesk, a multinational software company, acquired Grip Entertainment.

Kruszewski's latest venture builds on previous experience gained from working with computer vision technology. He founded  in April 2014 in Montreal's TandemLaunch incubator. With  he has developed BodySLAM, a deep learning AI body-tracking software.  As a man-machine interface, BodySLAM has multiple possible applications in various industries, such as health care, security, retail and entertainment. Sep. 17, 2021 — Hinge Health, the world’s #1 Digital Musculoskeletal Clinic™, has acquired wrnch, developer of the leading computer vision platform for measuring human motion. wrnch’s three-dimensional motion-tracking technology enables the same precise tracking of full-body movement used by elite athletes and the motion picture industry. Hinge Health has the largest computer vision team in digital health.

Publications and patents

Publications 
 The Botanical Beauty of Random Binary Trees, (1995)
 On the Horton-Strahler Number for Random Tries, (1996)
 An algorithm for sculpting trees, (1999)
 A probabilistic technique for the synthetic imagery of lightning, (1999)
 A Note on the Horton-Strahler Number for Random Binary Search Trees, (1999)
 Crowd Modeling For Military Simulations Using Game Technology, (2005)
 Believable and Reactive Crowds in Next Generation Games, (2006)
 Navigation Challenges in Massively Destructible Worlds (2007)
 Integrating Crowd-Behavior Modeling into Military Simulation using Game Technology, (2008)
 Engineering Fun, (2011)

Patents 
 Method and Stem for On-Screen Animation of Digital Objects or Characters, (2004)
 System and Method for Displaying Selected Garments on a Computer-Simulated Mannequin, (1999, 2009, 2011, 2012)

References 



1967 births
Living people
McGill University alumni
Canadian people of Polish descent
Computer vision researchers
Artificial intelligence researchers
University of Alberta alumni
Canadian software engineers
Businesspeople from Montreal
Scientists from Montreal